GTECH Corporation was a gaming technology company based in Providence, Rhode Island, United States. It was acquired in 2006 for $4.5 billion by Lottomatica of Italy, which later changed its own name to GTECH.

Ticker symbol
GTECH's ticker symbol on the New York Stock Exchange was GTK; however, the stock has been delisted.

Headquarters
GTECH Corp. moved its corporate headquarters from its campus in West Greenwich, Rhode Island to an $80 million, 10-story building in downtown Providence near Waterplace Park. GTECH S.p.A. operates on all continents except Antarctica, and it employs over 8,500 individuals worldwide in 52 countries. The company has customers in 114 countries and had revenues of 3.08 billion euro in 2012, an increase of 3.4% over the previous year.

See also 
 International Game Technology

References

Companies based in Providence, Rhode Island
Gambling companies of the United States
Technology companies of the United States
Companies established in 1980